Jiří Krkoška and Lukáš Lacko won in the final 6–1, 3–6, [10–3], against Ruben Bemelmans and Niels Desein.

Seeds
All seed pairs received a bye to the first round.

Draw

Draw

References
 Doubles Draw

Trophee des Alpilles - Doubles
2009 Doubles